The 16th American Society of Cinematographers Awards were held on February 17, 2002, honoring the best cinematographers of film and television in 2001.

Winners and nominees

Outstanding Achievement in Cinematography in Theatrical Release
 The Man Who Wasn't There – Roger Deakins
 Amélie – Bruno Delbonnel
 The Lord of the Rings: The Fellowship of the Ring – Andrew Lesnie
 Moulin Rouge! – Don McAlpine
 Pearl Harbor – John Schwartzman

Outstanding Achievement in Cinematography in Regular Series
 The West Wing (Episode: "Bartlet for America") – Thomas Del Ruth Alias (Episode: "Time Will Tell") – Michael Bonvillain
 Ally McBeal (Episode: "The Wedding") – Billy Dickson
 CSI: Crime Scene Investigation (Episode: "Alter Boys") – Michael Barrett
 The X-Files (Episode: "This Is Not Happening") – Bill Roe

Outstanding Achievement in Cinematography in Movie of the Week or Pilot for Basic or Pay TV
 Attila – Steven Fierberg Boss of Bosses – Brian J. Reynolds
 Just Ask My Children – Lowell Peterson
 Prancer Retuens – Bruce Worrall
 What Girls Learn – Malcolm Cross

Outstanding Achievement in Cinematography in Movie of the Week or Pilot for a Network
 Uprising'' – Denis Lenoir
 24 – Peter Levy
 Citizen Baines – Ernest Holzman
 Don Giovanni Unmasked – Rene Ohashi
 Smallville'' – Peter Wunstorf

International Award
 Douglas Slocombe

ASC Presidents Award
 Garrett Brown

Board of Governors Award
 Stanley Donen

Lifetime Achievement Award
 László Kovács

References

2001
2001 film awards
2001 television awards
2001 in American cinema
2001 in American television
American
2001 awards in the United States
February 2002 events in the United States